The Harrying of the North was a series of military campaigns waged by William the Conqueror in the winter of 1069–1070 to subjugate northern England, where the presence of the last Wessex claimant, Edgar Ætheling, had encouraged Anglo-Saxon, Anglo-Scandinavian and Danish rebellions. William paid the Danes to go home, but the remaining rebels refused to meet him in battle, and he decided to starve them out by laying waste to the northern shires using scorched earth tactics, especially in the historic county of Yorkshire and the city of York, before relieving the English aristocracy of their positions, and installing Norman aristocrats throughout the region.

Contemporary chronicles vividly record the savagery of the campaign, the huge scale of the destruction and the widespread famine caused by looting, burning and slaughtering. Some present-day scholars have labelled the campaigns a genocide, although others doubt whether William could have assembled enough troops to inflict so much damage and have suggested that the records may have been exaggerated or misinterpreted. Records from the Domesday Book of 1086 suggest that as much as 75% of the population could have died or never returned.

Background

At the time of the Norman Conquest the North consisted of what became Yorkshire.  Durham, and Northumberland in the east and Lancashire with the southern parts of Cumberland and Westmorland in the west. The population of the north pre-conquest can be described as "Anglo-Scandinavian" carrying a cultural continuity from a mixing of Viking and Anglo-Saxon traditions. The dialect of English spoken in Yorkshire may well have been different to people from the south of England, and the aristocracy was partly Danish in origin.

Further, communications between the north and south were difficult, partly due to the terrain but also because of the poor state of the roads. The more popular route between York and the south was by ship. In 962 Edgar the Peaceful had granted legal autonomy to the northern earls of the Danelaw in return for their loyalty; this had limited the powers of the Anglo-Saxon kings who succeeded him north of the Humber. The earldom of Northumbria stretched from the Tees to the Tweed

After the defeat of the English army and death of Harold Godwinson at the Battle of Hastings, English resistance to the conquest was centred on Edgar Ætheling, the grandson of Edmund Ironside. Ironside was half-brother to Edward the Confessor. It is said the English conceded defeat, not at Hastings, but at Berkhamsted two months later when Edgar and his supporters submitted to William in December 1066. However, of all the men who submitted to William at Berkhamsted it was only Ealdred, Archbishop of York, who would remain loyal to the Norman king. William faced a series of rebellions and border skirmishes in Dover, Exeter, Hereford, Nottingham, Durham, York and Peterborough.

Copsi, a supporter of Tostig (a previous Anglo-Saxon earl of Northumbria who had been banished by Edward the Confessor), was a native of Northumbria and his family had a history of being rulers of Bernicia, and at times Northumbria. Copsi had fought in Harald Hardrada's army with Tostig, against Harold Godwinson at the Battle of Stamford Bridge in 1066. He had managed to escape after Harald's defeat. When Copsi offered homage to William at Barking in 1067, William rewarded him by making him earl of Northumbria. After just five weeks as earl, Copsi was murdered by Osulf, son of Earl Eadulf III of Bernicia. When, in turn, the usurping Osulf was also killed, his cousin, Cospatrick, bought the earldom from William. He was not long in power before he joined Edgar Ætheling in rebellion against William in 1068.

With two earls murdered and one changing sides, William decided to intervene personally in Northumbria. He marched north and arrived in York during the summer of 1068. The opposition melted away, with some of them – including Edgar – taking refuge at the court of the Scottish king Malcolm III.

Back in Northumbria, William changed tactics and appointed a Norman, Robert de Comines, as earl, rather than an Anglo-Saxon. Despite warnings from the bishop, Ethelwin, that a rebel army was mobilised against him, Robert rode into Durham with a party of men on 28 January 1069,  where he and his men were surrounded and slaughtered The rebels then turned their attention to York where they killed the guardian of the castle there plus a large number of his men William's response was swift and brutal: he returned to York, where he fell on the besiegers, killing or putting them to flight.

Possibly emboldened by the fighting in the north, rebellions broke out in other parts of the country. William sent earls to deal with problems in Dorset, Shrewsbury and Devon, while he dealt with rebels in the Midlands and Stafford.

Edgar Ætheling had sought assistance from the king of Denmark, Sweyn II, a nephew of King Canute. Sweyn assembled a fleet of ships under the command of his sons. The fleet sailed up the east coast of England raiding as they went. The Danes with their English allies retook the city of York. Then, in the winter of 1069, William marched his army from Nottingham to York with the intention of engaging the rebel army. However, by the time William's army had reached York, the rebel army had fled, with Edgar returning to Scotland. As they had nowhere suitable on land to stay for the winter, the Danes decided to go back to their ships in the Humber Estuary. After negotiation with William, it was agreed that, if he made payment to them, then they would go home to Denmark without a fight. With the Danes having returned home, William then turned to the rebels. As they were not prepared to meet his army in pitched battle, he employed a strategy that would attack the rebel army's sources of support and their food supply.

The Harrying
William's strategy, implemented during the winter of 1069–70 (he spent Christmas 1069 in York), has been described by William E. Kapelle and some other modern scholars as an act of genocide. Contemporary biographers of William considered it to be his cruellest act and a "stain upon his soul". Writing about the Harrying of the North, over fifty years later, the Anglo-Norman chronicler Orderic Vitalis wrote (paraphrased):

The land was ravaged on either side of William's route north from the River Aire. His army destroyed crops and settlements and forced rebels into hiding. In the New Year of 1070 he split his army into smaller units and sent them out to burn, loot, and terrify. From the Humber to the Tees, William's men burnt whole villages and slaughtered the inhabitants. Food stores and livestock were destroyed so that anyone surviving the initial massacre would succumb to starvation over the winter. 

Florence of Worcester writing in the 12th century said that:

There are credible reports of survivors being reduced to cannibalism. In the early 12th century Symeon of Durham wrote:

Refugees from the harrying are mentioned as far away as Worcestershire in the Evesham Abbey chronicle. Other refugees fled to lowland Scotland.

In 1086, Yorkshire still had large areas of waste territory. It states that 66% of all villages contained wasted manors. Even the prosperous areas of the county had lost 60% of its value compared to 1066. Only 25% of the population and plough teams remained with a reported loss of 80,000 oxen and 150,000 people. The Domesday Book recorded a drastic decline in land values between 1066 and 1086, for Yorkshire, and between 1086 and the 12th century there was a corresponding drop in the value of the land for tax purposes.	

Independent archaeological evidence supports the massive destruction and displacement of people. The archaeologist Richard Ernest Muir wrote that there was evidence for the "violent disruption [that] took place in Yorkshire in 1069–71, in the form of hoards of coins which were buried by the inhabitants." B. K. Roberts in his book The Making of the English Village, suggests the reason that large numbers of villages have been laid out in regular pattern in Durham and  Yorkshire was through a restructuring at a single point in time, as opposed to natural settlement growth. He goes on to say that it is highly unlikely that such plans could have resulted from piecemeal additions and must have been necessary after the Harrying of the North. The dating is thought to be secure as it is known that Norman lords used similar regular plans in founding new towns in the 'plantation' of rural settlements in other conquered parts of the British Isles.

However, although the Domesday Book records large numbers of manors in the north as waste, some historians have posited it was not possible for William's relatively small army to be responsible for such wide-scale devastation imputed to him, so perhaps raiding Danes or Scots may have contributed to some of the destruction. It has been variously argued that waste signified manorial re-organisation, some form of tax break, or merely a confession of ignorance by the Domesday commissioners when unable to determine details of population and other manorial resources. 

According to Paul Dalton, it was questionable whether the Conqueror had the time, manpower or good weather necessary to reduce the north to a desert. It was evident, from the chroniclers, that William did harry the north but as the bulk of William's troops, Dalton suggests, were guarding castles in southern England and Wales, and as William was only in the north for a maximum of three months, the amount of damage he could do was limited. 

Mark Hagger suggests that in the words of the Anglo-Saxon Chronicle, William's Harrying of the North was "stern beyond measure" but should not be described as genocide as William was acting by the rules of his own time, not the present. Vegetius, the Latin writer, wrote his treatise De Re Militari in the fourth century about Roman warfare, and Hagger posits that this still would have provided the basis for military thinking in the eleventh century. Vegetius said, "The main and principal point in war is to secure plenty of provisions and to destroy the enemy by famine", so Hagger's conclusion is that the Harrying of the North was no worse than other similar conflicts of the time.

Other historians have questioned the figures supplied by Orderic Vitalis, who was born in 1075 and would have been writing Ecclesiastical History around 55 years after the event. The figure of 100,000 deaths was perhaps used in a rhetorical sense, as the estimated population for the whole of England, based on the 1086 Domesday returns, was about 2.25 million; thus, a figure of 100,000 represented a large proportion of the entire population of the country at that time (c. 4.5%).

David Horspool concludes that despite the Harrying of the North being regarded with some "shock" in Northern England for some centuries after the event, the destruction may have been exaggerated and the number of dead not as high as previously thought.

Legacy

In 1076 William appointed another Earl of Northumbria. This time it was Walcher, a Lotharingian, who had been appointed the first non-English Bishop of Durham in 1071.

Having effectively subdued the population, William carried out a complete replacement of Anglo-Saxon leaders with Norman ones in the North. The new aristocracy in England was predominantly of Norman extraction; however, one exception was that of Alan Rufus, a trusted Breton lord, who obtained in 1069–1071 a substantial fiefdom in North Yorkshire, which the Domesday Book calls "the Hundred of the Land of Count Alan", later known as Richmondshire. Here Alan governed, as it were, his own principality: the only location held by the King in this area was Ainderby Steeple on its eastern edge, while Robert of Mortain
held one village on its southern fringe; the other Norman lords were excluded, whereas Alan retained the surviving Anglo-Danish lords or their heirs. Alan also exercised patronage in York, where he founded St Mary's Abbey in 1088. By 1086 Alan was one of the richest and most powerful men in England.

In Scotland, Malcolm married the Ætheling's sister, Margaret, in 1071. Edgar sought Malcolm's assistance in his struggle against William.The marriage of Malcolm to Edgar's sister profoundly affected the history of both England and Scotland. The influence of Margaret and her sons brought about the Anglicisation of the Lowlands and provided the Scottish king with an excuse for forays into England, which he could claim were to redress the wrongs against his brother-in-law.

The formal link between the royal house of Scotland and Wessex was a threat to William, who marched up to Scotland in 1072 to confront the Scottish king. The two kings negotiated the Treaty of Abernethy (1072), through which, according to the Anglo Saxon Chronicle, Malcolm became William's vassal; among the other provisions was the expulsion of Edgar Ætheling from the Scottish court. Edgar finally submitted to William in 1074. William's hold on the crown was then theoretically uncontested.

In 1080 Walcher, the Bishop of Durham, was murdered by the local Northumbrians. In response, William sent his half-brother Odo, Earl of Kent north with an army to harry the Northumbrian countryside. Odo destroyed much land north of the Tees, from York to Durham, and stole valuable items from Durham monastery, including a rare sapphire-encrusted crozier. Many of the Northumbrian nobility were driven into exile.

After the conquest of 1066 the Normans used the church as an agent of colonisation with most of the wealthy churches in England passing into the hands of clerics from north west France. There had been no monasteries north of Burton upon Trent in 1066 but post harrying several monasteries were built including Fountains Abbey which became one of the largest and richest. With concern that Yorkshire could be attacked or invaded by the Scots or Vikings coupled with the threat of further revolts, the Normans reorganised the defences in the area and installed men chosen for their abilities to hold on to whatever they got. They increased the number of motte-and-bailey castles they built and in 1071 work commenced above the River Swale, to build a castle at a site now known as 'Richmond'. The name 'Richmond' is derived from the Norman French meaning 'strong hill'.  The Honour of Richmond, controlled by Alan Rufus,  served to defend the routes out of Scotland into the Vale of York. The central Vale of York was protected by the castles of Pontefract, Wakefield, Conisbrough and Tickhill. While the  Lordship of Holderness was reorganised to protect against invaders  from the North sea. 

As a result of the depopulation, Norman landowners sought settlers to work in the fields. Evidence suggests that such barons were willing to rent lands to any men not obviously disloyal. Unlike the Vikings in the centuries before, Normans did not settle wholesale in the shire, but only occupied the upper ranks of society. This allowed an Anglo-Scandinavian culture to survive beneath Norman rule. Evidence for continuity can be seen in the retention of many cultural traits. Many personal names of a pre-conquest character appear in charters that date from the 11th to the 13th century. The vigorous northern literary tradition in the Middle English period and its distinctive dialect also suggest the survival of an Anglo-Scandinavian population. The relative scarcity of Norman place-names implies that the new settlers came in only at the top rank. Domesday Book shows that at this level, however, Norman takeover in Yorkshire was virtually complete.

From the Norman point of view, the Harrying of the North was a successful strategy, as large areas, including Cheshire, Shropshire, Derbyshire and Staffordshire were devastated, and the Domesday Book confirms this, although in those counties it was not as complete as in Yorkshire. The object of the harrying was to prevent further revolts in Mercia and Northumbria; however, it did not prevent rebellions elsewhere.

See also
 List of massacres in the United Kingdom
 Earl of Northumbria

Notes

Citations

References

 
 
 
 
 
 
 
 
 
 
 	
 
 
 
 
 
 
 
 
 
 
 
 
 
 
 
 
 
 
 
 
 
 
 

11th-century massacres
Norman conquest of England
Massacres in England
Conflicts in 1069
Conflicts in 1070
William the Conqueror
1060s in England
1070s in England
Famines in Europe
Northern England
Looting
11th-century famines
Incidents of cannibalism
Cannibalism in Europe